The Basketball Bundesliga Best Defender (German: Basketball Bundesliga Bester Verteidiger) is an annual Basketball Bundesliga (BBL) award given since the 2002–03 season to the league's best defensive player. American player Immanuel McElroy is the all-time record holder for most awards, with five.

Winners

Awards won by player

Notes

References

External links
German League official website 

Basketball Bundesliga awards